Timo Lange (born 19 January 1968, in Grevesmühlen) is a German football coach and a former player.

References

External links
 

Living people
1968 births
Association football midfielders
German footballers
East German footballers
German football managers
Hallescher FC players
FC Hansa Rostock players
Bundesliga players
2. Bundesliga players
DDR-Oberliga players
People from Grevesmühlen
Footballers from Mecklenburg-Western Pomerania